Mélica Elisa Muñoz-Schick (b. 1941) is a Chilean botanist noted for her work curating the collections of the herbarium at the Chilean National Museum of Natural History, as well as her research into the flora of Chile.

Works

References

1941 births
Living people
Botanists with author abbreviations
Chilean women botanists
Women taxonomists
20th-century Chilean botanists
20th-century women scientists
21st-century Chilean botanists
21st-century women scientists